Several ships of the Swedish Navy have been named HSwMS Wrangel, named after the Carl Gustaf Wrangel:

  was a ship launched in 1666
  was a galley launched in 1742
  was a  launched in 1917 and decommissioned in 1947

Swedish Navy ship names